The epithet Nazarene was adopted by a group of early 19th-century German Romantic painters who aimed to revive spirituality in art. The name Nazarene came from a term of derision used against them for their affectation of a biblical manner of clothing and hair style.

History

In 1809, six students at the Vienna Academy formed an artistic cooperative in Vienna called the Brotherhood of St. Luke or Lukasbund, following a common name for medieval guilds of painters. In 1810 four of them, Johann Friedrich Overbeck, Franz Pforr, Ludwig Vogel and Johann Konrad Hottinger (1788-1827) moved to Rome, where they occupied the abandoned monastery of San Isidoro. They were joined by Philipp Veit, Peter von Cornelius, Julius Schnorr von Carolsfeld, Friedrich Wilhelm Schadow and a loose grouping of other German-speaking artists. They met up with Austrian romantic landscape artist Joseph Anton Koch (1768–1839) who became an unofficial tutor to the group. In 1827 they were joined by Joseph von Führich (1800–1876).

The principal motivation of the Nazarenes was a reaction against Neoclassicism and the routine art education of the academy system. They hoped to return to art that embodied spiritual values, and sought inspiration in artists of the late Middle Ages and early Renaissance, rejecting what they saw as the superficial virtuosity of later art.

In Rome the group lived a semi-monastic existence as a way of re-creating the nature of the medieval artist's workshop. Religious subjects dominated their output, and two major commissions allowed them to attempt a revival of the medieval art of fresco painting. The first was a fresco series completed in Rome for the Casa Bartholdy (1816–17; moved to the Alte Nationalgalerie in Berlin), a collaborative project by the Nazarenes that "marks the beginnng of the revival of fresco decoration for private and public buildings". This, and a second commission to decorate the Casino Massimo (1817–1829), gained international attention for the work of the "Nazarenes". However, by 1830 all except Overbeck had returned to Germany and the group had disbanded. Many Nazarenes became influential teachers in German art academies.

Legacy
The programme of the Nazarenes—the adoption of what they called honest expression in art and the inspiration of artists before Raphael—was to exert considerable influence in Germany upon the Beuron Art School, and in England upon the Pre-Raphaelite movement. They were also direct influences on the British artists William Dyce and Frederick Leighton and Ford Madox Brown.

Notable members

 Peter von Cornelius
 Josef Führich
 Johann Friedrich Overbeck
 Franz Pforr
 Friedrich Wilhelm Schadow
 Julius Schnorr von Carolsfeld
 Eduard Jakob von Steinle
 Philipp Veit
 Johannes Veit
 Ludwig Vogel
 Eugene von Guerard

Other painters associated with the movement

Carl Joseph Begas
 Karl von Blaas
Ernst Deger
Konrad Eberhard
Carl Eggers
Marie Ellenrieder
Gebhard Flatz
Matthias Goebbels
Josef von Hempel
Franz Theobald Horny
Franz Ittenbach
Gustav Jäger
Leopold Kupelwieser
Friedrich Lange
Ferdinand Olivier
Friedrich Olivier
Johann David Passavant
Carl Gottlieb Peschel
Johann Anton Ramboux
Theodor Rehbenitz
Johann Scheffer von Leonhardshoff
Ludwig Schnorr von Carolsfeld
Johann von Schraudolph
Joseph Anton Settegast
Johann Michael Wittmer
 Giuseppe Hyzler and his brother Vincenzo Hyzler from Malta

See also
Gabriel Wüger
German Romanticism
Middle Ages in history
Pre-Raphaelite Brotherhood
Purismo

Further reading
 Mitchell Benjamin Frank. Romantic Painting Redefined: Nazarene Tradition and the Narratives of Romanticism. Ashgate Publishing, 2001; 
 Cordula Grewe. Painting the Sacred in the Age of German Romanticism. Aldershot: Ashgate Books, 2009.
 Lionel Gossman. Making of a Romantic Icon: The Religious Context of Friedrich Overbeck's 'Italia und Germania'''. American Philosophical Society, 2007. . 
 Lionel Gossman. "Unwilling Moderns: The Nazarene Painters of the Nineteenth Century" in Nineteenth-Century Art Worldwide'' – Volume 2, Issue 3, Autumn 2003.

References

External links 

 Nazarenes in the "History of Art"